Flatwoods Township is an inactive township in Ripley County, in the U.S. state of Missouri.

Flatwoods Township was erected in 1910, taking its name from the community of Flatwoods, Missouri.

References

Townships in Missouri
Townships in Ripley County, Missouri